Wiang Nuea, Mae Hong Son is a village and tambon (sub-district) of Pai District, in Mae Hong Son Province, Thailand. In 2005 it had a population of 3,727 people. The tambon contains 10 villages.

References

Tambon of Mae Hong Son province
Populated places in Mae Hong Son province